Matteo Busato (born 20 December 1987) is an Italian racing cyclist, who most recently rode for UCI ProTeam . He rode at the 2014 UCI Road World Championships.

Major results

2008
 10th ZLM Tour
2009
 7th Trofeo Zsšdi
 9th Coppa della Pace
 9th Giro del Medio Brenta
 10th Overall Girobio
2010
 2nd Trofeo Edil C
 3rd Overall Giro della Regione Friuli Venezia Giulia
 6th Coppa della Pace
 6th Trofeo Gianfranco Bianchin
 9th Ruota d'Oro
2011
 1st Overall Giro della Regione Friuli Venezia Giulia
 8th Trofeo Alcide Degasperi
 9th Overall Girobio
2012
 1st Giro del Medio Brenta
 3rd Trofeo Edil C
 3rd Gran Premio Industrie del Marmo
 7th Trofeo Alcide Degasperi
2013
 1st GP Capodarco
2014
 1st  Overall Kreiz Breizh Elites
 5th Overall Sibiu Cycling Tour
 5th Overall Giro della Regione Friuli Venezia Giulia
 8th Circuito de Getxo
 10th Tour de Berne
 10th GP Industria & Artigianato di Larciano
2015
 6th Overall Tour of Qinghai Lake
2016
 2nd Memorial Marco Pantani
 5th Giro dell'Appennino
 7th Overall Settimana Internazionale di Coppi e Bartali
 7th Gran Premio della Costa Etruschi
 8th Trofeo Laigueglia
 9th Coppa Ugo Agostoni
2017
 8th Giro dell'Appennino
2018
 3rd Overall Tour de Korea
 3rd Trofeo Laigueglia
2019
 3rd Overall Tour de la Mirabelle
 9th La Drôme Classic

Grand Tour general classification results timeline

References

External links
 

1987 births
Living people
Italian male cyclists
Cyclists from the Province of Treviso